East Pakistan Communist Party (Marxist–Leninist), a communist party in the erstwhile East Pakistan. The party emerged in 1966, after a split in the Communist Party of East Pakistan. Sukhendu Dastidar became the general secretary of EPCP(M-L).

Bangladesh Liberation War and aftermath
In 1971, Mohammad Toaha and Abdul Haq refused to participate for the independence of Bangladesh. After the war two separate EPCP(M-L)s were formed, one led by Toaha's EPCP(M-L) which evolved into the Communist Party of Bangladesh (Marxist-Leninist) and the other led by Abdul Haq. Mohammad Toaha's party denounced Charu Majumdar's ideology of class annihilation.

In 1978 Haque's party took the name Revolutionary Communist Party of Bangladesh (Marxist-Leninist).

References

Communist parties in Bangladesh
Political parties established in 1966
Communist parties in Pakistan
1966 establishments in East Pakistan